The Open School of Management is a post-secondary, non-tertiary business education institution with branches in Berlin and New York City.

Certificate in Management 

The school offers a distance and online program in management with a recommended duration of one year which can be extended to two years. The course leads to a Certificate in Management according to ISCED  Level 4.

The course is authorized by the ZFU, the German state central agency for distance education.

Curriculum 

The curriculum is customizable and can be personalized by selecting course modules based on the student's prior knowledge and professional objectives.

The course offers modules in the following areas: general management, organization, human resource management, marketing, special areas of management, management theories, and case studies in different industries.

Notable Module Autors 

Many professors and lecturers teach at internationally recognized schools that rank among the best universities in the world. This includes for example (alphabetically): ESCP Europe, Harvard Business School, HEC Paris, Cambridge Judge Business School, MIT Sloan, NUS Business School, Rotterdam School of Management, Saïd Business School, Wharton School, etc.

 Joshua Ackerman, MIT Sloan, Consumer Behavior
 Roberto Garcia-Castro, IESE Business School, Business Ethics
 Mauro Guillén, Wharton School, International Management
 Francesca Gino, Harvard Business School, Human Relations and Behavioral Theory
 Bertrand Moingeon, HEC Paris, Organizational Learning
 Jochen Menges, WHU, Leadership
 Jeffrey Pfeffer, Stanford University, Path Dependence Theory

External links 
 Official website

References 

Business schools in New York (state)
Business schools in Germany
Distance education institutions based in Germany